Community Chests, commonly referred to as community trusts, community foundations and united way organizations, are endowment funds pooled from a community for the purpose of charitable giving. The first Community Chest, "Community Fund", was founded in 1913 in Cleveland, Ohio, by the Federation for Charity and Philanthropy. The number of Community Chest organizations increased from 39 to 353 between 1919 and 1929, and surpassed 1,000 by 1948. By 1963, and after several name changes, the term "United Way" was adopted in the United States, whereas the United Way/Centraide name was not adopted in Canada until 1973–74.

The Community Chest was promoted on several old-time radio shows, including the H. J. Heinz Company–sponsored The Adventures of Ozzie and Harriet show, the S. C. Johnson & Son–sponsored Fibber McGee and Molly show, and the Chevron-sponsored Let George Do It show. 

Some local organizations continue to use the Community Chest name, such as Concord-Carlisle Community Chest in Concord, Massachusetts, United States. It also continues to be used as the name for a gameplay feature in the board game Monopoly.

See also
 The Community Chest of Hong Kong
 United Givers Fund
 United Way of America
 United Way Worldwide
 Whiting Williams

References
 United Way Central Coast Community Chest - Australia

1913 establishments in Ohio
Charities based in Canada
Charities based in the United States
Organizations established in 1913
Community